A Woman Commands is a 1932 American pre-Code film directed by Paul L. Stein and starring Pola Negri, Roland Young, and Basil Rathbone. Some additional scenes were directed by an uncredited Harry Joe Brown.

Cast
Pola Negri as Madame Maria Draga/Queen Draga of Serbia
Roland Young as King Alexander
Basil Rathbone as Captain Alex Pastitsch
H. B. Warner as Colonel Stradimirovitsch
Anthony Bushell as Lt. Iwan Petrovitch
Reginald Owen as The Prime Minister
May Boley as Mascha
Frank Reicher as The General
George Baxter as Chedo
David Newell as Adutant

Reception
According to RKO records, the film made a loss of $265,000.

References

External links

1932 films
1932 drama films
American black-and-white films
American drama films
Films directed by Paul L. Stein
Films directed by Harry Joe Brown
Films scored by Arthur Lange
Films set in Belgrade
Cultural depictions of Serbian kings
Cultural depictions of Serbian monarchs
Cultural depictions of Serbian women
Biographical films about Serbian royalty
1930s English-language films
1930s American films
RKO Pictures films